State Route 198 is a north–south state highway in the western portion of the U.S. state of Ohio.

Route description
No part of SR 198 in Ohio is included as a part of the National Highway System (NHS).  The NHS is a network of highways that are identified as being most important for the economy, mobility and defense of the nation.

SR 198 heads north from an interchange with U.S. Route 33 concurrent with SR 67 and SR 501.  The road enter downtown Wapakoneta where SR 67 turns east and both SR 198 and SR 501 turn west.  The two routes head west and then turns towards the northwest.  Just before leaving Wapakoeta SR 501 leaves the concurrency heading due north.  The highway now enters rural Auglaize County passing through farmland.  Before the road enters Allen County is an intersection with SR 197.  The route enters Allen County and has an intersection with SR 117.  This intersection is the northern terminus of SR 117.

History
1926 – Rerouted to its current alignment, which was the former alignment of State Route 116, and from its current northern terminus to the village of Southworth along previously and currently unnumbered roads.
1946 – Truncated at its current northern terminus; its former alignment north to Southworth decertified.

Major intersections

References

198
Transportation in Auglaize County, Ohio
Transportation in Allen County, Ohio